Rosa 'Harlekin, (aka KORlupo),  is a modern climbing rose cultivar, bred by Reimer Kordes in Germany in 1986. It is considered to be the best of the bicolored modern climbing roses. It blooms continuously throughout the growing season.

Description
'Harlekin' is a tall, bushy climbing rose, 8 to 12 ft (250—365 cm) in height with a 3 to 4 ft (90—121 cm) spread. Blooms are  3.5 in (8.9 cm) in diameter, with 26 to 40 petals. Flowers have a high-centered, cupped form, are borne singly or in small clusters  up to five, and are freely borne. The flowers are bicolored, cream with reddish-pink edges, and with little fading as the flower matures.  The rose has a strong, wild rose fragrance and glossy, dark green foliage. The plant is recommended for USDA zone 4b and warmer.

See also
Garden roses
Rose Hall of Fame
List of Award of Garden Merit roses

Notes

References

Harlekin